Bellerose  is a village in the Town of Hempstead in Nassau County, on Long Island, in New York, United States. The population was 1,173 at the 2020 census.

History 
The village was founded by Helen Marsh of Williamsburg, Brooklyn. In 1907, planning to build a model community, Marsh purchased  of Floral Park gladiola fields. The first Bellerose home was completed, under Marsh's supervision, in 1910. Marsh persuaded the Long Island Rail Road to place a station in the new village, and she named the station Bellerose. Though it has been suggested that she named the station for the Rose farm, south of the railroad, and her daughter Belle, she said that she simply found the name "euphonious". A vote of the homeowners made the name official in 1917.

Bellerose incorporated itself as a village in 1924 in order to gain home rule.

The Bellerose Village Hall, Fire House and Police Booth are on the National and State registries of Historic Places; the complex is known as the Bellerose Village Municipal Complex.

Geography

The village borders Queens to the north, Bellerose Terrace to the west, and Floral Park to the south.

Demographics

2020 census

Note: the US Census treats Hispanic/Latino as an ethnic category. This table excludes Latinos from the racial categories and assigns them to a separate category. Hispanics/Latinos can be of any race.

2000 Census
As of the census of 2000, there were 1,173 people, 378 households, and 333 families residing in the village. The population density was 12,207.3 people per square mile (4,529.0/km2). There were 384 housing units at an average density of 3,996.2 per square mile (1,482.6/km2). The racial makeup of the village was 90.79% White, 0.43% African American, 6.65% Asian, 0.85% from other races, and 1.28% from two or more races. Hispanic or Latino of any race were 4.35% of the population.

There were 378 households, out of which 42.6% had children under the age of 18 living with them, 78.3% were married couples living together, 6.3% had a female householder with no husband present, and 11.9% were non-families. 9.8% of all households were made up of individuals, and 5.6% had someone living alone who was 65 years of age or older. The average household size was 3.10 and the average family size was 3.32.

In the village, the population was spread out, with 25.4% under the age of 18, 7.5% from 18 to 24, 27.0% from 25 to 44, 28.6% from 45 to 64, and 11.4% who were 65 years of age or older. The median age was 39 years. For every 100 females, there were 96.8 males. For every 100 females age 18 and over, there were 92.7 males.

The median income for a household in the village was $100,263, and the median income for a family was $110,404. Males had a median income of $72,917 versus $50,625 for females. The per capita income for the village was $36,446. None of the families and 0.9% of the population were living below the poverty line, including no under eighteens and 1.3% of those over 64.

Government 
As of August 2022, the Mayor of Bellerose is Kenneth Moore, the Deputy Mayor is Joseph Juliano, and the Village Trustees are Ann Marie Byrnes, Kate Dorry, and Daniel Driscoll.

Notable people
Joanne Persico, volleyball coach
John P. Shanley (1915-1985), journalist, specializing in radio, television and drama, who spent much of his career with The New York Times.
Nick Wall, (1906-1983), jockey

See also
 Bellerose Terrace, New York, an unincorporated hamlet located adjacent to the village, to its west.

References

External links

 

Hempstead, New York
Villages in New York (state)
Villages in Nassau County, New York